Liessies is a commune in the Nord department in northern France.

It is known for Liessies Abbey, of which the abbey church and the park have been preserved.

Heraldry

See also
Communes of the Nord department

References

Communes of Nord (French department)